The Galt Island Archeological District (also known as the Galt Island Shell Midden or Galt Island Burial Mound) is a U.S. historic district (designated as such on May 21, 1996) located on Galt Island, near St. James City, Florida.

References

External links
 Lee County listings at National Register of Historic Places
 Lee County listings at Florida's Office of Cultural and Historical Programs

Shell middens in Florida
Archaeological sites in Florida
Archaeological sites on the National Register of Historic Places in Florida
National Register of Historic Places in Lee County, Florida
Historic districts on the National Register of Historic Places in Florida
Mounds in Florida